Narubis is a settlement in the ǁKaras Region of southern Namibia with post office, hotel and shops, situated off the national road B1  south-east of Keetmanshoop and  north-north-east of Karasburg. The name is of Khoekhoen origin and means 'place of Inaru trees', after the Euclea pseudebenus.

References

Populated places in the ǁKaras Region